The 1992 NCAA Division I men's ice hockey tournament involved 12 schools competing to determine the national champion of men's  NCAA Division I college ice hockey. Beginning with the 1992 tournament the format was changed to single-elimination play for all rounds of the tournament. First and quarterfinal rounds were played at two predetermined sites as the East and West Regionals.  The tournament began on March 26, 1992, and ended with the championship game on April 4 in which Lake Superior State defeated the University of Wisconsin 5-3. A total of 11 games were played. Wisconsin's participation in the tournament was later vacated by the NCAA Committee on Infractions.

Alaska-Anchorage's 1992 participation was the last time an independent team was selected to the tournament, until Arizona State in 2019.

The 1992 championship game is most remembered for the controversial penalty calls that gave Lake Superior State 11 power plays in the game. Wisconsin staff and players were so incensed at the calls that referee Tim McConaghy was accosted after the match which led to two Wisconsin players being suspended for the Badgers' next NCAA Tournament game while assistant coach Bill Zito was barred from any affiliation with Wisconsin for the program's next two NCAA appearances.

Qualifying teams
The at-large bids and seeding for each team in the tournament were announced after the conference tournaments concluded. The Central Collegiate Hockey Association (CCHA), Hockey East and Western Collegiate Hockey Association (WCHA) all had three teams receive a berth in the tournament, the ECAC had two berths, and there was one independent Division I bid.

* Maine was required to forfeit 13 victories after the season concluded, their total here was their record at the time of the start of the tournament.

^ These teams records reflect the losses they had against Maine at the time that were later overturned.

Game locations
 East Regional – Providence Civic Center, Providence, Rhode Island
 West Regional – Joe Louis Arena, Detroit
 Frozen Four – Knickerbocker Arena, Albany, New York

Tournament bracket
Wisconsin's participation in the 1992 tournament was later vacated by the NCAA Committee on Infractions.

Note: * denotes overtime period(s)

Regional Quarterfinals

East Regional

(3) New Hampshire vs. (6) Wisconsin

(4) Boston University vs. (5) Michigan State

West Regional

(3) Lake Superior State vs. (6) Alaska-Anchorage

(4) Northern Michigan vs. (5) Clarkson

Regional semifinals

East Regional

(1) Maine vs. (5) Michigan State

(2) St. Lawrence vs. (6) Wisconsin

West Regional

(1) Michigan vs. (4) Northern Michigan

(2) Minnesota vs. (3) Lake Superior State

Frozen Four

National semifinal

(W3) Lake Superior State vs. (E5) Michigan State

(W1) Michiganvs. (E6) Wisconsin

National Championship

(W3) Lake Superior State vs. (E6) Wisconsin

All-Tournament team
G: Darrin Madeley (Lake Superior State)
D: Mark Astley (Lake Superior State)
D: vacated†
F: Paul Constantin* (Lake Superior State)
F: Brian Rolston (Lake Superior State)
F: vacated†
* Most Outstanding Player(s)
† Participation of D: Barry Richter and F: Jason Zent vacated when Wisconsin's participation in the tournament was later vacated

Record by conference

References

Tournament
NCAA Division I men's ice hockey tournament
NCAA Division I men's ice hockey tournament
NCAA Division I men's ice hockey tournament
NCAA Division I men's ice hockey tournament
NCAA Division I men's ice hockey tournament
NCAA Division I men's ice hockey tournament
NCAA Division I men's ice hockey tournament
Ice hockey competitions in Albany, New York
Ice hockey competitions in Providence, Rhode Island
Ice hockey competitions in Detroit
Ice hockey competitions in New York (state)